Liv Bernhoft Osa (born 3 March 1957) is a Norwegian actress.

She was born in Voss, a daughter of folk musician Sigbjørn Bernhoft Osa. She made her stage debut at Nationaltheatret in 1979, and has since mainly been assigned with this theatre, except for shorter periods at other theatres. She received the Hedda Award in 2011, for best female supporting role in the play Uskyld. She received the Amanda Award for best leading actress (the character "Alma") in the 2016 film Pyromaniac.

In her first marriage, she was married to stage and film director Pål Løkkeberg (1934–1998), and is thus a daughter-in-law of Rønnaug Alten and Georg Løkkeberg.

External links

References

1957 births
Living people
People from Voss
Norwegian stage actresses
Norwegian film actresses